Let's Face It is a 1943 American musical film directed by Sidney Lanfield and written by Harry Tugend, adapted from the musical of the same name. The film stars Bob Hope, Betty Hutton, ZaSu Pitts, Phyllis Povah, Dave Willock, Eve Arden, and Cully Richards. The film was released on August 5, 1943, by Paramount Pictures. A New York Times critic at the time of its release wrote, "Strictly as hot-weather fare, Let's Face It, now at the Paramount, is an acceptable bit of monkeyshines, but not much more. As a vehicle for Bob Hope it is a rather feeble and outdated contraption, and if it weren't for Mr. Hope himself Let's Face It would be a very sad affair indeed."

Plot
U.S. Army private Jerry Walker is in hot water with his sweetheart, Winnie Porter, for putting off their wedding, and with his superiors on the base after crashing a Jeep.

To raise money to pay for the damages and avoid six months of guard duty, Jerry accepts a $300 proposal from three matronly women, Cornelia, Nancy and Maggie, to arrange dates for them with young soldiers. Jerry ropes his pals Barney and Frankie into it, then scrambles when they try to squirm out of it.

Winnie, meantime, figures out Jerry is up to something. She shows up with the girlfriends of Barney and Frankie, after which everybody takes turns trying to make the others jealous. Jerry finally flees, only to end up hooked by a German submarine. He ends up in the brig, but it's a year later and Winnie, now his wife, comes to visit along with their baby.

Cast

Bob Hope as Jerry Walker
Betty Hutton as Winnie Porter
ZaSu Pitts as Cornelia Figeson
Phyllis Povah as Nancy Collister
Dave Willock as Barney Hilliard
Eve Arden as Maggie Watson
Cully Richards as Frankie Burns
Marjorie Weaver as Jean Blanchard
Dona Drake as Muriel
Raymond Walburn as Julian Watson
Andrew Tombes as Judge Henry Clay Pigeon
Arthur Loft as George Collister
Joe Sawyer as Sergeant Wiggins
Grace Hayle as Mrs. Wigglesworth
Evelyn Dockson as Mrs. Taylor
Emory Parnell as Colonel

References

External links

1943 films
1943 musical comedy films
American black-and-white films
American films based on plays
American musical comedy films
1940s English-language films
Films based on musicals
Films directed by Sidney Lanfield
Films scored by Robert Emmett Dolan
Films set on the home front during World War II
Paramount Pictures films
1940s American films